The cordonata (Italian word, from cordone, which in architecture means "linear element which emphasizes a limit") is a sloping road interrupted at regular distances by low (8-10 cm) steps in the form of transversal stripes (cordoni) made of stone or bricks. It has a form almost similar to a flight of steps, but allows the transit of horses and donkeys. 

Famous Italian cordonate are in Rome, one leading from Piazza d'Aracoeli to Piazza del Campidoglio (the "cordonata capitolina", designed and built by Giacomo della Porta  in 1581–82 after Michelangelo's plans) and another leading to the Piazza del Quirinale, giving the name to a road (Via della Cordonata).

References

Footpaths
Types of roads